MMSA may refer to:
Malta Medical Students' Association, a student association in the University of Malta
Master of Midwifery of the Society of Apothecaries, a qualification introduced in 1928
Mercantile Marine Service Association, a trade union 1857–1899, precursor of Nautilus International
Midwest Military Simulation Association, an American group of wargamers